Air Vice Marshal Sir Colin Scragg,  (8 September 1908 – 5 April 1989) was a senior Royal Air Force officer.

RAF career
Scragg was commissioned from the rank of flight sergeant on 24 February 1938. He served in the Second World War as officer commanding, No. 166 Squadron from December 1943 before being shot down over Germany and becoming a prisoner of war in January 1944.

After the war he became Deputy Director of Operational Requirements in 1950, Director of Operational Requirements in November 1955 and Air Officer Commanding, No. 23 Group in December 1958. His last appointment was as Deputy Controller Aircraft at the Ministry of Aviation in 1960 before retiring in September 1964.

References

1908 births
1989 deaths
Royal Air Force air marshals
Knights Commander of the Order of the British Empire
Companions of the Order of the Bath
Recipients of the Air Force Cross (United Kingdom)